Salvatore Oppes (Pozzomaggiore, 2 November 1909 – 27 February 1987) was an Italian show jumping rider who won a silver medal at the Olympic Games.

Biography
In his career he participated in two editions of the Summer Olympics, is the older brother of Antonio Oppes (1916–2002).

Achievements

References

External links
 

1909 births
1987 deaths
Italian show jumping riders
Olympic equestrians of Italy
Italian male equestrians
Olympic silver medalists for Italy
Equestrians at the 1952 Summer Olympics
Equestrians at the 1956 Summer Olympics
Equestrians at the 1960 Summer Olympics
Medalists at the 1956 Summer Olympics
Equestrians of Centro Sportivo Carabinieri